Southern Iran consists of the southern mountain ranges of Zagros and Central Iranian Range, Khuzestan Plain and the northern coasts of Persian Gulf and Straight of Hormuz.

It includes the provinces of Fars, Kohgiluyeh and Buyer Ahmad, Hormozgan and Bushehr. Sometimes Khuzestan and Kerman are also included in this region. 

The major cities are Shiraz, Bandarabbas, Bushehr, Marvdasht, Jahrom, Yasuj, Fasa and Borazjan.

Southern Iran is ethnically diverse, including Persians, Lurs, Bakhtiaris, Qashqais, Achomians, Basseries, Baloch, Arabs, Armenians, Afro-Iranians and Jews. Southern Iran is the homeland of the Persian people. Most people in southern Iran are ethnically Persian (including Persian subgroups like Lurs and Bakhtiaris).
 
Most people in Southern Iran are part of the Iranian ethno-linguistic group and speak an Iranian language.

Climate
Hot desert climate in the plains and the coast of the Persian Gulf.
Cold semi-arid climate in the mountain ranges.

See also
 Northern Iran
 Northwestern Iran
 Western Iran
 Eastern Iran
 Central Iran

References 

Subdivisions of Iran